Mahé River (also known as Mayyazhipuzha or the English Channel of India) is a river in South India. It flows through the state of Kerala and the coastal exclave of Mahé in Puducherry.

The flow of the river
The Mahé River originates in the slopes of the Western Ghats part of the Wayanad district. Initially the river flows through the hilly eastern towns of the Kozhikode district like Vilangad, Vanimel, Jathiyeri, Perod and Nadapuram. Then the river enters into the Malabar plains where it flows through several towns namely, Parakkadavu, Kadavathur, Peringathur, Eramala, Kunnumkara, Kariyad and Peringandi. Then the river flows through the northern boundary of the Union Territory of Mahé and empties into the Arabian Sea.

Economy
The influence on the economy of the region traversed by the river is very little. The river has been used for inland navigation and transportation of articles from interior villages to Mahé and back, in olden days. The government of Puducherry has planned to build a fishing harbour at the estuary of the river. However owing to technical reasons the harbour, which is under construction, is on the beach adjacent to the estuary. To enhance tourist potential of Mahé a Riverside Walkway, originating from the Water Sports Complex at Manjakkal, Mahé, on the banks of the river stretching out to the breakwater of the [Fishing Harbour]is also being built by the government of Puducherry.

Trivia
M. Mukundan's magnum opus novel Mayyazhippuzhayude Theerangalil (P. 1974 ; Malayalam for "On the banks of the Mahé River"), celebrates this river. Mayyazhi river known as the "English channel" in India during the period of British rule, because it separated British-ruled Tellicherry from French-ruled Mahé. It is the most polluted river in God's Own Country.

See also
 List of rivers in Kerala
 List of dams and reservoirs in Kerala
 List of rivers in India

References

External links

Rivers of Kannur district
Rivers of Puducherry
Rivers of Kozhikode district
Rivers of Wayanad district
Rivers of the Western Ghats
Rivers of India